List of all members of the Storting in the period 1973 to 1977.  The list includes all those initially elected to the Storting.

There were a total of 155 representatives, distributed among the parties: 62 to Norwegian Labour Party,
29 to Conservative Party of Norway, 21 to Centre Party (Norway), 20 to Christian Democratic Party of Norway,
16 to Sosialistisk Valgforbund,
4 to Anders Langes Party, 2 to Venstre (Norway) and 1 to Det Nye FolkePartiet.

Aust-Agder

Vest-Agder

Akershus

Buskerud

Finnmark

Hedmark

Hordaland

Møre and Romsdal

Nordland

Oppland

Oslo

Rogaland

Sogn and Fjordane

Telemark

Troms

Nord-Trøndelag

Sør-Trøndelag

Vestfold

Østfold

 
Parliament of Norway, 1973–77